Simone Niggli-Luder (born 9 January 1978) is a Swiss orienteering athlete who has twice won (in 2003 and 2005) all four women's competitions at the world championships. She is widely seen as one of the greatest orienteers of all time.

Personal life 

Born as Simone Luder, she grew up in Burgdorf in the Canton of Bern. She studied biology at the University of Bern, where she graduated in 2003. That same year, she married Matthias Niggli, also a Swiss orienteering athlete. They currently live in Münsingen near Bern and in Ulricehamn, Sweden.

Orienteering Achievements 

She began competing in orienteering early on, joining the Swiss club OLV Hindelbank; at the age of ten, she participated in her first competition. Since then, her palmarès has been impressive: she won a gold medal at the junior world championships in 1997, has been 20 times Swiss champion, won the Finnish championships once and the Swedish championships nine times, has won the world cup five times, and won seven gold medals at European championships and a total of 23 gold medals at world championships.

In 2003, she won all four women's competitions of the world championships held at Rapperswil in Switzerland (sprint, middle, and long distance, and— together with Birgitte Wolf and Vroni König-Salmi— the relay). She managed to repeat this extraordinary feat two years later at the world championships in Aichi, Japan.

At the European Championships in 2006 in Otepää, Estonia, she won gold in the sprint and long distance competitions, and finished fifth in the middle distance competition. The Swiss team finished second in the relay, beaten only by the Finnish team. At the world championships 2007 in Kyiv, Ukraine, she again won gold on the middle and sprint distances and finished third on the long distance, behind two Finnish athletes who shared first place.

Niggli-Luder took time off from competitive orienteering in 2008 to give birth to her first child and again in 2011, twins. She made a successful return to the international orienteering scene in 2009 by winning bronze medals in the middle and sprint distances at the World Orienteering Championships in Miskolc, Hungary, and the gold medal in the long distance. At the World Championships 2013 at Vuokatti, Finland, she won all three single competitions (sprint, middle, and long distance) and finished third in the team relay event (together with Sara Luescher and Judith Wyder).

In 2001, she spent one year in Finland, running for the Finnish club Turun Suunnistajat, and won the Finnish championship. She ran for the Swedish club Ulricehamns OK after July 2003. In September 2013, Niggli-Luder announced that she was retiring from elite orienteering at the end of the year, after the last World Cup race in New Zealand. Niggli holds over 60 World Cup race victories.

World Championship results

External links 

 
 

1978 births
Living people
People from Burgdorf, Switzerland
Swiss orienteers
Female orienteers
Foot orienteers
World Orienteering Championships medalists
World Games gold medalists
Competitors at the 2001 World Games
Competitors at the 2005 World Games
People from Münsingen
World Games medalists in orienteering
University of Bern alumni
Sportspeople from the canton of Bern
Junior World Orienteering Championships medalists